The Arab Club Championship is an annual basketball tournament for Arab teams. The competition is organised by the Arab Basketball Confederation (ABC). Each season is typically held in October and is held in one venue. The tournament typically features 16 to 18 teams.

Egyptian club Al-Ittihad Alexandria is the most successful club in the tournament's history, as the team has won a record 7 titles.

Summary

Tournament History

Statistics

Titles by team

* ex. Fastlink
** ex. IRB Alger

Titles by country

Performance by club (2015–present) 
The following is a list of clubs who have played in the Arab Club Championship since the 2015 season.

Most Valuable Players

See also
Arab Women's Club Basketball Championship

References

External links
 Competition standings at goalzz.com

Basketball
Basketball club competitions in Africa
Basketball club competitions in Asia
International club basketball competitions